Super Bug is an arcade game developed, manufactured, and released by Atari, Inc. in 1977. The player steers a yellow Volkswagen Beetle (or "Bug") along a multidirectionally scrolling track, avoiding the boundaries and occasional obstacle. The game ends when fuel runs out. Super Bug is in black and white, and the colored car comes from a yellow overlay in the center of the monitor.

The 1978 Atari arcade game Fire Truck is based on Super Bug. Both games were programmed by Howard Delman.

Development
Originally titled City Driver, the video game Super Bug was the first to be designed and programmed by Howard Delman. Delman stated in an interview that he had to learn a lot of the game development process during the nine months it took to create Super Bug.

Joe Decuir of Atari was writing an Atari 8-bit family version of the game, but it was never finished.

Reception
In the United States, it was among the top 35 highest-grossing arcade games of 1977, according to RePlay. It went on to become the fourth highest-grossing arcade game of 1978 according to Play Meter, or the year's fifth highest according to RePlay. It was later the 19th highest-grossing arcade video game of 1979, according to Play Meter.

References

1977 video games
Arcade video games
Arcade-only video games
Atari arcade games
Cancelled Atari 8-bit family games
Top-down racing video games
Video games developed in the United States